IEC 61883 Consumer Audio/Video Equipment - Digital Interface is a technical standard for a digital interface that is used by IEEE 1394 (FireWire) devices for audio and video equipment. The standard for these devices is maintained by the International Electrotechnical Commission. The first part was released in 1998; the current third edition is dated 2008.

Parts 
61883-1
General

61883-2
SD-DVCR data transmission

61883-3
HD-DVCR data transmission

61883-4
MPEG2-TS data transmission

61883-5
SDL-DVCR data transmission

61883-6
Audio and music data transmission

61883-7
Transmission of ITU-R BO.1294 System B

61883-8
Transmission of ITU-R BT.601 style digital video data

References

Sources 
 
 

61883
Audio network protocols